Rotherhithe is a station on the East London Line located on the southern bank of the River Thames at Rotherhithe within the London Borough of Southwark, Greater London and is served by London Overground services. The station re-opened for a preview service on 27 April 2010 to  /  and 23 May 2010 for full service to New Cross / West Croydon / . On 9 December 2012, the line was extended to serve Clapham Junction via Peckham Rye.

History
 
The station was originally opened on 7 December 1869, when the first section of the East London Railway was opened. On 1 October 1884, the Metropolitan and District Railways began running services along the East London Railway, which called at Rotherhithe. It was served by electric passenger trains from 31 March 1913, when the line was electrified. Goods trains from  station continued to pass through until April 1966.

The original station entrance was located in Albion Street, which meant that access to platforms was at the opposite end of the platforms from the present access.

Decorative vitreous enamel panels were added to the platforms. The station was then closed between 1995 and 1998 due to repair work on the Thames Tunnel and from 22 December 2007 to 27 April 2010 for the extension of the East London Line.

The present surface building is located a short distance to the south of the original entrance shaft to the Thames Tunnel. It was extensively remodelled between March 1995 and March 1998, in conjunction with the renovation of the East London Line. The building was heavily refurbished for the re-opening of the ELL, with the entrance being enlarged by replacing two of the windows with arches.

London Overground

The station's future was in doubt for a while after the announcement of the East London Line extension, as Rotherhithe's platforms can only take four-car trains and cannot be lengthened. Thus it was initially thought that Rotherhithe station might have to close when the line was extended. However, on 16 August 2004 the Mayor of London, Ken Livingstone, announced that the station would remain open.

Layout

Rotherhithe station has two platforms (northbound and southbound) and is accessed by two escalators (one up, one down) and a flight of stairs to a landing, then stairs only to platform level.

There are ticket barriers in the ticket office controlling access to the platforms.

The station platforms are situated close to the southern end of the 1843 Thames Tunnel built by the Brunels, and some of the tunnel's original brickwork can be seen from the north end of the platforms. A better view of the Thames Tunnel portals can be seen from the platforms at Wapping railway station on the opposite side of the river.

At the southern end of the Rotherhithe station platforms, the approach ramp for the 1908 Rotherhithe Tunnel passes above the railway on a low and angled road bridge which is highly unusual for being located below water level. The bridge structure is easily visible (pictured, left) and is currently painted blue. The Rotherhithe Tunnel portal is also visible when looking up from the southern end of the northbound platform.

Services

All times below are correct as of the December 2015 timetables.

London Overground

East London Line

On Mondays to Saturdays there is a service every 5–10 minutes throughout the day, while on Sundays before 13:00 there is a service every 5–9 minutes, changing to every 7–8 minutes until the end of service after that. Current off peak frequency is:

8 northbound to Highbury & Islington
8 northbound to 
4 southbound to West Croydon
4 southbound to 
4 southbound to 
4 southbound to  via  (very limited weekdays-only service to/from )

Connections
London Buses routes 381, C10 and night route N381 serve the station.

References

Railway stations in the London Borough of Southwark
Former East London Railway stations
Railway stations in Great Britain opened in 1869
Railway stations served by London Overground
Railway stations with vitreous enamel panels
Rotherhithe
1869 establishments in England
Railway stations located underground in the United Kingdom
London Overground Night Overground stations